Michelle "Mary" Conn (born September 17, 1963 in Edmonton, Alberta) is a former field hockey player from Canada. She represented her native country at the 1992 Summer Olympics in Barcelona, Spain. There she ended up in seventh place with the Canadian National Team, after having finished in sixth position four years earlier in Seoul, South Korea.  Inducted into the Alberta Sports Hall of Fame & Museum in 2001.

References

External links
 
 
 
 

1963 births
Living people
Canadian female field hockey players
Olympic field hockey players of Canada
Field hockey players at the 1988 Summer Olympics
Field hockey players at the 1992 Summer Olympics
Pan American Games medalists in field hockey
Pan American Games silver medalists for Canada
Pan American Games bronze medalists for Canada
Field hockey players at the 1987 Pan American Games
Field hockey players at the 1991 Pan American Games
Sportspeople from Edmonton
Medalists at the 1991 Pan American Games
Medalists at the 1995 Pan American Games
Medalists at the 1987 Pan American Games